Holidaydream: Sounds of the Holidays, Vol. One is a Christmas album release by The Polyphonic Spree.

Track listing
All arrangements by the Polyphonic Spree except "Silent Night" arranged by Ricky Rasura and "Happy Xmas (War Is Over)" by John Lennon/Yoko Ono.

Charts

References

The Polyphonic Spree albums
2012 Christmas albums
Christmas albums by American artists